The Golden Years (Zlatne godine) is a Croatian drama film written and directed by Davor Žmegač. It was released in 1993.

Plot summary

Cast

 Igor Galo as Jakov Petras
 Goran Grgić as Mislav Petras
 Aleksandra Turjak as Sunčana Križić
 Mirta Zečević as Tala
 Ilija Ivezić as Brkan
 Dejan Aćimović as Stipe Bubalo
 Inge Appelt as Sunčana's Aunt
 Mirko Boman as Cop No. 2
 Slavko Brankov as Prisoner
 Vanja Drach as Relja
 Ksenija Pajić as Marija Petras
 Marija Kohn as Sunčana's Mother

References

External links
 

1993 films
1990s Croatian-language films
Croatian drama films
Films set in Zagreb
Films set in 1971
Films set in 1990
1993 directorial debut films
1993 drama films